Alexander Glynn Campbell (1796 – 5 November 1836) was a Member of Parliament for Fowey from 1819–1820.

Campbell was the only son of Colonel Alexander Campbell of Ardchattan, Argyllshire (1766–1844) and his wife Jane Meux Worsley of Gatcombe Park, Isle of Wight (1774–1819). He was born at Westover Lodge, Isle of Wight, on 10 August 1796. There were two other children of the marriage: Jane Elizabeth Mary Campbell (1803–1878) and Sophia Margaret Ann Campbell (1805–1827). Campbell died 5 November 1836 in Italy.

References

William Berry, County Genealogies Pedigrees of the Families in the County of Hants (1833), p139. The date given here for Alexander Glynn Campbell's birth is 1797.
Letter dated 13 August 1796 from Edmund John Glynn, Glynn, Cornwall, to Colonel Alexander Campbell, Westover Lodge, Isle of Wight. Private collection.

Politicians from the Isle of Wight
Members of the Parliament of the United Kingdom for constituencies in Cornwall
1796 births
1836 deaths
UK MPs 1818–1820